Amazake-babaa ("amazake hag") is an old woman yōkai from the folklore of Miyagi and Aomori prefectures.  She is rumored to come to the doors of houses late at night asking for amazake in a childlike voice, but if anyone answers they fall ill.  It was said that to keep her away, a cedar branch is placed in the doorway.  She was also known as the goddess of smallpox in a time when smallpox ran rampant in Japan. Mothers will give offerings to amazake-babaa in order to prevent their children from falling ill.

A similar creature is known as the amazake-banbaa in the Yamanashi Prefecture. She tries to sell her sake and amazake door-to-door and will bring disease to those who answer. She will be repelled by a sign by the door that says "we do not like sake or amazake".

References

 疱瘡の神，甘酒婆 | ホウソウノカミ，アマザケババ | 怪異・妖怪伝承データベース
:ja:甘酒婆

Culture in Miyagi Prefecture
Culture in Aomori Prefecture
Yōkai
Female legendary creatures